Brian G. Jamieson (born March 7, 1969 in Livingston, New Jersey) is an American rower.

References 

 
 

1969 births
Living people
People from Livingston, New Jersey
Rowers at the 1996 Summer Olympics
Olympic silver medalists for the United States in rowing
American male rowers
Medalists at the 1996 Summer Olympics
Pan American Games medalists in rowing
Pan American Games silver medalists for the United States
Rowers at the 1995 Pan American Games
Medalists at the 1995 Pan American Games